Cow and Cuddles is a 1921 Australian short comedy film. It was the directorial debut of Tal Ordell who later made the classic The Kid Stakes. It experienced difficulties obtaining a release.

References

1921 films
1921 comedy films
Australian silent short films
Australian black-and-white films
Australian comedy short films
Silent comedy films